The Parish of Claremont, is a civil parish of the Cumberland County.

It included the suburbs of St Marys, New South Wales, Kingswood, and Badgeries Creek.

The southern boundary of the parish is Orphan School Road in Fairfeild, the western boundary Bringillley Road, the eastern boundary is South Creek (New South Wales), the western boundary was South Creek, New South Wales and the northern boundary was the Great Western Highway.

References

History of Sydney
Geography of New South Wales
Populated places in New South Wales